Hermann Glüsing (October 27, 1908 – September 25, 1981) was a German politician of the Christian Democratic Union (CDU) and member of the German Bundestag.

Life 
From 1945 he was a member of the CDU. Hermann Glüsing was a member of the German Bundestag from 1949 to 1972. He was always a directly elected member of parliament for the constituency of Nordfriesland – Dithmarschen Nord and, from 1965, after the reorganization of the constituencies of Schleswig-Holstein, for the constituency of Husum.

Literature

References

1908 births
1981 deaths
Members of the Bundestag for Schleswig-Holstein
Members of the Bundestag 1969–1972
Members of the Bundestag 1965–1969
Members of the Bundestag 1961–1965
Members of the Bundestag 1957–1961
Members of the Bundestag 1953–1957
Members of the Bundestag 1949–1953
Members of the Bundestag for the Christian Democratic Union of Germany